Liquidambar, commonly called sweetgum 
(star gum in the UK), 
gum, redgum, satin-walnut, or American storax, is the only genus in the flowering plant family Altingiaceae and has 15 species. They were formerly often treated in Hamamelidaceae. They are native to Southeast and east Asia, the eastern Mediterranean and eastern North America. They are decorative deciduous trees that are used in the wood industry and for ornamental purposes.

Etymology
Both the scientific and common names refer to the sweet resinous sap (liquid amber) exuded by the trunk when cut.

Species

Extant species

Fossils
 †Liquidambar changii - Miocene (Washington state, North America)

Description
 	
	
	
Their leaves can be many colors such as bright red, orange, yellow, and even purple. Mature bark is grayish and vertically grooved. The flowers are small, produced in a dense globular inflorescence  diameter, pendulous on a  stem. The fruit is a woody multiple capsule  in diameter (popularly called a "gumball"), containing numerous seeds and covered in numerous prickly, woody armatures, possibly to attach to fur of animals. The woody biomass is classified as hardwood.

At higher latitudes, Liquidambars are among the last of trees to leaf out in the spring, and also among the last of trees to drop its leaves in the fall/autumn, turning multiple colors. Fall/autumn colors are most brilliant where nights are chilly, but some cultivars color well in warm climates.

Distribution
Species within this genus are native to Southeast and east Asia, western Mediterranean and eastern North America. Countries and regions in which they occur are: Indonesia (Nusa Tenggara, Jawa, Sumatera); Malaysia (Peninsular Malaysia); Thailand; Cambodia; Vietnam; China (including Fujian, Guizhou, Hainan, Yunnan, Zhejiang}; Taiwan; Korea; Laos; Myanmar; India (including Assam); East Himalaya; Tibet; Turkey; Greece (Rodes); Nicaragua; Honduras; El Salvador; Guatemala; Belize; Mexico; and eastern USA (from Texas to Connecticut). It is regarded as introduced/naturalised in Italy, Spain, Belgium and New York, USA. In cultivation they can be seen in warm temperate and subtropical climates around the world.

Fossil records
 
This genus is known in the fossil record from the Cretaceous to the Quaternary (age range: 99.7 to 0.781 million years ago). The genus was much more widespread in the Tertiary, but has disappeared from Europe due to extensive glaciation in the north and the east–west oriented Alps and Pyrenees, which have served as a blockade against southward migration. It has also disappeared from western North America due to climate change, and also from the unglaciated (but nowadays too cold) Russian Far East. There are several fossil species of Liquidambar, showing its relict status today.

Uses
The wood is used for furniture, interior finish, paper pulp, veneers and baskets of all kinds. The heartwood once was used in furniture, sometimes as imitation mahogany or Circassian walnut. It is used widely today in flake and strand boards. Sweetgum is a foodplant for various Lepidoptera caterpillars, such as the gypsy moth. The American sweetgum is widely planted as an ornamental, within its natural range and elsewhere.

The hardened sap, or gum resin, excreted from the wounds of the sweetgum, for example, the American sweetgum (Liquidambar styraciflua), can be chewed on like chewing gum and has been long used for this purpose in the Southern United States. The sap was also believed to be a cure for sciatica, weakness of nerves, etc.

In Traditional Chinese medicine, lu lu tong, or "all roads open," is the hard, spiky fruit of native sweetgum species. It first appeared in Chinese medical literature in Omissions from the Materia Medica, by Chen Cangqi, in 720 AD. Bitter in taste, aromatic, and neutral in temperature, lu lu tong is claimed to promote the movement of blood and qi, water metabolism and urination, expels wind, and unblocks the channels. It is supposedly an ingredient in formulas for epigastric distention or abdominal pain, anemia, irregular or scanty menstruation, low back or knee pain and stiffness, edema with difficult urination, or nasal congestion.

In the fall/autumn, the trees drop their hard, spiky seedpods by the hundreds, which can become a serious nuisance on pavements and lawns. Some US cities have expedited permits to remove liquidambar trees.

Gallery

References

 
 Ind. Eng. Chem. Process Des. Dev., 1985, 24 (3), pp 836–844

External links
 
 
 
 University of Florida IFAS Extension – Liquidambar styraciflua: Sweetgum (accessed: 09 SEP 2018)

 
Altingiaceae
Cretaceous genus first appearances
Extant Cretaceous first appearances
Ornamental trees
Saxifragales genera